St. Joseph's Hospital, Saint Joseph Hospital, St. Joseph Medical Center, etc.  may refer to:

Canada
St. Joseph's Auxiliary Hospital, Edmonton Metropolitan Region, Alberta
St. Joseph's General Hospital, Vegreville, Alberta
Mount Saint Joseph Hospital, Vancouver, British Columbia
St. Joseph's Health Centre, Toronto, Ontario
St. Joseph's Healthcare Hamilton, Hamilton, Ontario
St. Joseph's Hospital, Comox, British Columbia
St. Joseph's Hospital (1876-1980s), Victoria, British Columbia. Now St. Joseph's Apartments, hospital operations moved to Victoria General Hospital

Denmark
St. Joseph's Hospital, Aarhus

Republic of Ireland
St. Joseph's Hospital, Dublin
St. Joseph's Hospital, Limerick
St. Joseph's Hospital, Sligo

Palestine
 St. Joseph's Hospital, Jerusalem

Uganda
 St. Joseph's Hospital Kitgum, Kitgum, Northern Uganda

United Kingdom
St Joseph's Hospital, Newport, Wales

United States
 St. Joseph's Hospital (Fairbanks, Alaska) (closed 1968)
 St. Joseph's Hospital and Medical Center, Phoenix, Arizona
 St. Joseph's Hospital (Tucson, Arizona)
 Providence Saint Joseph Medical Center, Burbank, California
 Providence St. Joseph Hospital Orange, Orange, California
 St. Joseph's Hospital (San Francisco, California) (closed 1979 and converted to condominiums c. 1985)
 Saint Joseph Hospital (Denver, Colorado)
 Saint Joseph's Hospital (Atlanta), Atlanta, Georgia
 OSF St. Joseph Medical Center, Bloomington, Illinois
 St. Joseph Hospital (Fort Wayne, Indiana)
 Cloud County Health Center (formerly St. Joseph's Hospital), Concordia, Kansas
 Saint Joseph Hospital (Lexington, Kentucky)
 St. Joseph Medical Center (Towson, Maryland)
 Lowell General Hospital, Massachusetts, one campus of which was known as St. Joseph's Hospital prior to 1992
 St. Joseph's Hospital (St. Paul, Minnesota)
 St. Joseph Medical Center (Kansas City, Missouri)
 St. Joseph's Hospital (Lewistown, Montana)
 St. Joseph's Hospital (Omaha, Nebraska)
 St. Joseph Hospital (Nashua, New Hampshire)
 St. Joseph's Regional Medical Center, Paterson, New Jersey
 St. Joseph's Hospital, Syracuse, New York
 St. Joseph's Medical Center (Yonkers, New York)
 Mission St. Joseph Hospital, Asheville, North Carolina
 St. Joseph's Hospital (Reading, Pennsylvania), now part of Penn State Milton S. Hershey Medical Center
 Saint Joseph's Hospital (Rhode Island), Providence, Rhode Island
 St. Joseph's Hospital (Memphis, Tennessee)
 St. Joseph Medical Center (Houston, Texas)
 St. Joseph Medical Center (Tacoma, Washington)
 St. Joseph's Children's Hospital (Tampa, Florida)
 St. Joseph's Women's Hospital (Tampa, Florida)
 St. Joseph's Hospital (Tampa, Florida)

Δ